Kevin Oris (born 6 December 1984 in Turnhout) is a Belgian football player who plays for Wezel Sport. He is a tall attacker, which makes him an ideal target man.

Career
Oris always played with third and fourth division teams until he scored 35 goals in 27 matches with FCV Meerhout. This earned him a transfer to Jupiler League side SV Roeselare. Due to a lack of chances, Oris went to KVSK United in second division, which was again a successful period. He returned to the highest level of Belgian football in 2008 and signed for RAEC Mons. Mons were relegated in the 2008-09 season. On 18 January 2012, it was announced that Oris signed a contract with South Korean side Daejeon Citizen. He became the first Belgian player to ever play in the K League 1. He scored 16 goals in 37 games (5th in the league). In the 2013 season, he joined Jeonbuk Hyundai Motors and had another successful season, scoring 14 goals in 31 matches. In January 2014, Oris transferred to Chinese Super League side Liaoning Whowin but he left early as the team failed to provide wages.

On 16 February 2015, Oris transferred to fellow K League 1 side Incheon United.

References

External links

Kevin Oris player info at sporza.be 

 Kevin Oris Interview

Living people
1984 births
Belgian footballers
Association football forwards
K.S.V. Roeselare players
R.A.E.C. Mons players
Royal Antwerp F.C. players
Daejeon Hana Citizen FC players
Jeonbuk Hyundai Motors players
Liaoning F.C. players
Sportkring Sint-Niklaas players
Incheon United FC players
K.V.V. Thes Sport Tessenderlo players
Kyoto Sanga FC players
Challenger Pro League players
Belgian Pro League players
K League 1 players
Chinese Super League players
Belgian expatriate footballers
Belgian expatriate sportspeople in South Korea
Belgian expatriate sportspeople in China
Belgian expatriate sportspeople in Japan
Expatriate footballers in South Korea
Expatriate footballers in China
Expatriate footballers in Japan
Sportspeople from Turnhout
Footballers from Antwerp Province